Monrovia is an at-grade light rail station on the L Line of the Los Angeles Metro Rail system. It is located at the intersection of Duarte Road and Myrtle Avenue in Monrovia, California, after which the station is named.

This station opened on March 5, 2016, as part of Phase 2A of the Foothill Extension project. This station and all the other original Gold Line and Foothill Extension stations will be part of the A Line upon completion of the Regional Connector project in 2023.

History

The Los Angeles and San Gabriel Valley Railroad built the first train tracks and station in Monrovia in 1887. The Los Angeles and San Gabriel Valley Railroad was founded in 1883, by James F. Crank with the goal of bringing a rail line to San Gabriel Valley from downtown Los Angeles. Los Angeles and San Gabriel Valley Railroad was sold on May 20, 1887 into the California Central Railway. In 1889 this was consolidated into Southern California Railway Company. On January 17, 1906 Southern California Railway was sold to the Atchison, Topeka and Santa Fe Railway and designated the Pasadena Subdivision.

Installed in 1887, a mule-drawn railway with a single passenger car, called the Myrtle Avenue Railroad at that time ran from the Monrovia station up Myrtle Ave to downtown Monrovia. On the way back down to the rail station, the mule was loaded onto a flatcar and downhill gravity took the cars back to the station. By the early 1920s the partially mule-powered streetcar system was removed. In 1906 the first Pacific Electric rail car arrived in Monrovia. The PE Pasadena and Monrovia line ended in 1951. Santa Fe Middle School near the station is named after the Santa Fe Railway. 

The current railway station reuses the former Atchison, Topeka and Santa Fe Railway depot which was built in 1926. It is designed in a Spanish colonial revival style. The 1926 station replaced a wooden depot built on the site in 1886 by the original Los Angeles and San Gabriel Valley Railroad. Santa Fe and later Amtrak ran the Southwest Chief and Desert Wind over this line in Monrovia, but rerouted passenger trains to the Fullerton Line in 1986. The Santa Fe line served the San Gabriel Valley until 1994, when the 1994 Northridge earthquake weakened the bridge in Arcadia. With the completion of the Gold Line in Monrovia, the 1926-era Monrovia train station is slated to be restored.

The Santa Fe Depot was used in a number of Hollywood movies through the years. It is used two times in the 1966 movie The Trouble with Angels, both at the start and the ending in which the girls leave St. Francis Academy.

Vehicle maintenance facility
As part of the light rail extension, the Gold Line Authority and Metro built a new Maintenance and Operations (M&O) Facility in Monrovia, east of Monrovia station. The  facility services, cleans and stores light rail vehicles for Metro's fleet, with a total storage capacity of 104 vehicles. The facility, known as Metro Division 24 Yard, is located just north of the right of way between California Avenue and Shamrock Avenue. It cost $53 million to build.

Service

Station layout

Hours and frequency

Connections 
, the following connections are available:
 Foothill Transit:

Neighborhood and destinations

The city of Monrovia is planning to create a transit-oriented district around near its station. The district, known as the Station Square Transit Village Mixed Use District, will be designed to feature mixed retail, residential and office uses, with pedestrian amenities and connections. Construction of phase one of the new district started in 2017. Plans are to restore/renovate the historic 1926 Monrovia Santa Fe train station depot at the location, though the actual use of the station is not yet determined .

References

External links
Foothill Extension Construction Authority
Metro Project Page, Foothill Extension
I Will Ride - Blog of Foothill Extension supporters

Railway stations in the United States opened in 1926
Railway stations closed in 1972
Railway stations in the United States opened in 2016
Former Atchison, Topeka and Santa Fe Railway stations in California
L Line (Los Angeles Metro) stations
Monrovia, California
1926 establishments in California
1972 disestablishments in California
2016 establishments in California